Rudan County is in Hormozgan province, Iran. The capital of the county is the city of Rudan. At the 2006 census, the county's population was 104,222 in 21,923 households. The following census in 2011 counted 118,547 people in 29,066 households. At the 2016 census, the county's population was 124,522 in 34,561 households.

Administrative divisions

The population history and structural changes of Rudan County's administrative divisions over three consecutive censuses are shown in the following table. The latest census shows four districts, 10 rural districts, and three cities.

References

 

Counties of Hormozgan Province